Alexander MacPherson, (1847 – 17 December 1935), was an English architect.  Although born in Nottingham he worked for the majority of his career in and around Derby, where he had moved in 1880. He served as president of the Nottinghamshire and Derbyshire Architectural Society.

Career
He was for many years in partnership with architect W. E. Richardson. He also worked in conjunction with surveyor John Ward, who subcontracted architectural work to him, although sometimes signing drawings produced by MacPherson.

MacPherson worked in a variety of styles from the baroque of department stores such as the Co-Operative Central Halls he designed in Derby and elsewhere, to the 'Queen Anne' of the now demolished Children's Hospital in Derby. He was however, perhaps happiest designing in the Tudor style made popular during the Arts and Crafts movement. Buildings such as Littleover Old Hall, Derbyshire (1898), Reginald Street Public Baths, Derby (1904), Victoria Street Tramways Office, Derby (1904), and the workers' houses he built for the Liversage Charity Estate and Haslam foundry in Derby are characteristic of this style. MacPherson's interiors were often crammed with richly carved woodwork. His rooms in Aston Hall, Aston upon Trent, and the Friary, Friargate, Derby, are good surviving examples of this style.

In later years he increasingly adopted the classical style, his work for the Walker Okeover family of Osmaston Manor, Derbyshire, being a good example of this period in his career. His last known major work, Bemrose School in Derby, is a powerful essay in the pared down classical style (1928–30), which has recently been altered.

Many of MacPherson's buildings have been destroyed. Two conservation areas within the City of Derby, Chester Green and Nottingham Road have, however, been created to protect his buildings.

Notable works

References

1847 births
1935 deaths
Architects from Nottingham
Architects from Derby